Another Life is a 1975 novel by Yuri Trifonov. It is the fourth part of Trifonov's quintet of Moscow novels following the third volume The Long Good-Bye (1971). The novel focuses on a widow's reaction to the sudden death of her husband.

References

1975 Russian novels
Novels by Yury Trifonov